John Conley may refer to:

John Conley (American football) (born 1950), former football player
John Conley (Wisconsin politician) (born 1828), member of the Wisconsin State Assembly
John D. Conley (1843–1926), professor in geology and physics at the University of Wyoming; see John D. Conley House
John D. Conley House, on the National Register of Historic Places
John Conley, bassist in the Australian jazz band Galapagos Duck
John Conley, musician in the American Indie pop band Holiday Flyer
John Conley, corporal in UPR, killed in The Troubles in Garvagh

See also
John Conlee, American country music singer
Jack Conley (disambiguation)